Monopotassium glutamate (MPG) is the compound with formula KC5H8NO4. It is a potassium salt of glutamic acid.

It has the E number E622 and is used in foods as a flavor enhancer.  It is a non-sodium MSG alternative.

See also

 Monoammonium glutamate

Glutamates
Potassium compounds
Flavor enhancers
E-number additives